The American College of Chest Physicians (CHEST) is a medical association in the United States consisting of physicians and non-physician specialists in the field of chest medicine, which includes pulmonology, critical care medicine, and sleep medicine.  The group was founded in 1935. It has a membership of over 19,000.

See also
 Chest (journal)

References

External links
 Official website
 

Medical associations based in the United States
Professional titles and certifications
Pulmonology and respiratory therapy organizations
Scientific organizations established in 1935
Medical and health professional associations in Chicago